UIMS may refer to:

Universal Information Management System
User interface management systems
University Institute of Management Sciences at Pir Mehr Ali Shah Arid Agriculture University, Rawalpindi, Pakistan
Unknown Intellectual Mechanized Species, the main antagonistic race in the Galaxian 3 and Starblade video games